This table details the steam locomotives of the Hunslet Austerity 0-6-0ST class that have been preserved on heritage railways. Of the 484 'Austerities' constructed, around 70 have survived into preservation, often referred to by enthusiasts as "Buckets".

Although the Hunslet Engine Company were responsible for the design, not all of these locomotives were built by the company.  In order to meet wartime demand, Hunslet subcontracted some of the construction to Andrew Barclay Sons & Co., W. G. Bagnall, Hudswell Clarke, Robert Stephenson and Hawthorns and the Vulcan Foundry.

Several have been painted as LNER Class J94s to represent mainline rather than industrial use.
Not all have survived intact; the boiler of RSH 7135 of 1944 was used on the replica Broad gauge locomotive "Iron Duke" built in 1985.  One has been turned into a Thomas the Tank Engine lookalike, and another into one of Douglas, also from The Railway Series.

The Scottish Railway Preservation Society have formed an Austerity Locomotive Owners Association (A.L.O.A.) with the aim of being a central point for owners of Austerity locomotives to share information and assistance.

List of locomotives

References

External links 

Preserved UK Railway Locomotives Database

Lists of locomotives and rolling stock preserved on heritage railways in England
0-6-0ST locomotives
Austerity preserved
War Department locomotives
Railway locomotives introduced in 1943
Railway locomotive-related lists